Ḥafṣa bint al-Ḥājj ar-Rakūniyya (born c. 1135, died AH 586/1190–91 CE) was a Granadan aristocrat and perhaps one of the most celebrated Andalusian female poets of medieval Arabic literature.

Biography 
We know little about Ḥafṣa's origins and early life. Sources do not tell us when she was born, but her birth must have been in or after AH 530/1135. She was the daughter of a Berber man, al-Hajj ar-Rukuni, a Granadan, who does not seem to have left traces among biographers. This family was noble and rich. We can therefore consider the father of Hafsa a notable figure in the city. Around the time that the Almohads came to power in 1154, Ḥafṣa seems to have begun a relationship with the poet Abū Jaʿfar Aḥmad ibn ʿAbd al-Malik Ibn Saʿīd; to judge from the surviving poetry, Ḥafṣa initiated the affair. With this, Ḥafṣa enters the historical record more clearly; the relationship seems to have continued until Abū Jaʿfar's execution in 1163 by Abū Saʿīd ʿUthmān, son of Abd al-Mu'min and governor of Granada: Abū Jaʿfar had sided with his extended family, the Banu Saʿid, against Adb al-Muʿmin.

Ḥafṣa later became known as a teacher, working for Caliph Abu Yusuf Yaqub al-Mansur to educate his daughters in Marrakesh. She died there in 1190 or 1191. She is perhaps one of the most celebrated Andalusian female poets of medieval Arabic literature.

Poetry 
Around 60 lines of Ḥafṣa's poetry survive, among nineteen compositions, making Ḥafṣa the best attested of the medieval female Moorish poets (ahead of Wallada bint al-Mustakfi and Nazhun al-Garnatiya bint al-Qulai’iya). Her verse encompasses love poetry, elegy, panegyric, satirical, and even obscene verse, giving her work unusual range. Perhaps her most famous exchange is a response to Abū Jaʿfar, here as translated by A. J. Arberry:

 Abu Jaafar the poet was in love with Hafsa, and sent her the following poem:
 God ever guard the memory
 Of that fair night, from censure free,
 Which hid two lovers, you and me,
 Deep in Mu’ammal’s poplar-grove;
 And, as the happy hours we spent,
 There gently wafted a sweet scent
 From flowering Nejd, all redolent
 With the rare fragrance of the clove.

 High in the trees a turtle-dove
 Sang rapturously of our love,
 And boughs of basil swayed above
 A gently murmuring rivulet;
 The meadow quivered with delight
 Beholding such a joyous sight,
 The interclasp of bodies white,
 And breasts that touched, and lips that met.

 Hafsa replied in this manner:

 Do not suppose it pleased the dell
 That we should there together dwell
 In happy union; truth to tell,
 It showed us naught but petty spite.
 The river did not clap, I fear,
 For pleasure that we were so near,
 The dove raised not his song of cheer
 Save for his personal delight.

 Think not such noble thoughts as you
 Are worthy of; for if you do
 You’ll very quickly find, and rue,
 High thinking is not always wise.
 I scarce suppose that yonder sky
 Displayed its wealth of stars on high
 For any reason, but to spy
 On our romance with jealous eyes.

References

Sources
 
 Moorish Poetry: A Translation of ’The Pennants’, an Anthology Compiled in 1243 by the Andalusian Ibn Saʿid, trans. by A. J. Arberry (Cambridge: Cambridge University Press, 1953), pp. 94–95.
 Arie Schippers, 'The Role of Women in Medieval Andalusian Arabic Story-Telling', in Verse and the Fair Sex: Studies in Arabic Poetry and in the Representation of Women in Arabic Literature. A Collection of Papers Presented at the Fifteenth Congress of the Union Européenne des Arabisants et des Islamisants (Utrecht/Driebergen, September 13-19, 1990), ed. by Frederick de Jong (Utrecht: Publications of the M. Th. Houstma Stichting, 1993), pp. 139-51 http://dare.uva.nl/document/184872.
 Marlé Hammon, 'Hafsa Bint al-Hajj al Rukuniyya', in Medieval Islamic Civilisation: An Encyclopedia, ed. by Josef W. Meri, 2 vols (New York: Routledge, 2006), I 308.
 Marla Segol, 'Representing the Body in Poems by Medieval Muslim Women', Medieval Feminist Forum, 45 (2009), 147-69: http://ir.uiowa.edu/mff/vol45/iss1/12.

12th-century Berber people
12th-century women writers
12th-century Arabic writers
Arabic-language women poets
Arabic-language poets
Berber poets
Women poets from al-Andalus
1191 deaths